Roaldite is a rare meteorite mineral containing iron, nickel and nitrogen.

It was first described in 1981 for an occurrence in the Youngedin meteorite, Avon, Western Australia. It was named after Roald Norbach Nielsen (born 1928), a Danish expert in electron microprobe. The mineral has also been reported from the Jerslev meteorite, Sjaelland, Denmark, and the Canyon Diablo meteorite of Meteor Crater in Arizona.

See also
 Glossary of meteoritics

References

Iron minerals
Nickel minerals
Native element minerals
Meteorite minerals
Cubic minerals
Minerals in space group 215